WalletHub (formerly CardHub.com) is a personal finance website that was launched in August 2013. It is based in Miami and owned by Evolution Finance, Inc.

WalletHub offers free consumer tools, such as its WalletLiteracy Quiz and its Financial Fitness Tool, which provides users with credit reports, scores and monitoring. The company also successfully overcame a public trademark dispute with Major League Baseball, brought on behalf of the Washington Nationals and Chicago Cubs.

History
According to Web reports, WalletHub initially positioned itself as a “personal finance social network” with a focus on reviews for financial advisors.

The company also produces research reports, including a quarterly credit card debt report and reports comparing cities and states in financially relevant categories. For example, in mid-November 2021, a weekly New York Times feature used Wallethub's data for what the Times headlined "The Best and Worst Cities For Celebrating Thanksgiving."

References

Financial services companies established in 2013
Internet properties established in 2013
Finance websites